National Highway 85 (or NH 85) is a National Highway in southern India. It links Kochi in Kerala with Thondi, Tamil Nadu.

Route 
Starting from NH66 intersection in Kundanoor Junction at Maradu, Kochi, Ernakulam, Kolenchery, Muvattupuzha, Kothamangalam, Neriamangalam, Adimali, Munnar, Devikulam, Poopara in Kerala. -> Bodi, Theni, Andippatti, Usilampatti, Madurai, Thiruppuvanam, Sivagangai, Kalayarkoil, and ending at Thondi at NH32 intersection in Tamil Nadu.

See also 
 List of National Highways in India (by Highway Number)
 National Highways Development Project

References

External links
 NH 85 on MapsofIndia.com

National highways in India
National Highways in Tamil Nadu
National Highways in Kerala
Roads in Ernakulam district
Roads in Idukki district